Pasquale Errichelli (also Ericchelli or Enrichelli; 1730–1785) was an Italian composer and organist based in the city of Naples. Trained at the Conservatorio della Pietà dei Turchini, his compositional output consists of 7 operas, 2 cantatas, 1 symphony, 3 sonatas, several concert arias, and the oratorio Gerosolina protetta. He was for many years the organist at the Cattedrale di Napoli.

Operas
La serva astuta (opera buffa, 1753, Naples; in collaboration with Gioacchino Cocchi)
Il finto turco (opera buffa, libretto by Antonio Palomba, 1753, Naples; in collaboration with Gioacchino Cocchi)
Issipile (opera seria, libretto by Pietro Metastasio, 1754, Naples)
La finta 'mbreana (commedia, libretto by G. Bisceglia, 1756, Naples; in collaboration with Nicola Bonifacio Logroscino)
Solimano (opera seria, libretto by Giovanni Ambrogio Migliavacca, 1757, Rome)
Siroe (opera seria, libretto by Pietro Metastasio, 1758, Naples)
Eumene (3 Acts) (opera seria, libretto by Apostolo Zeno, 1771, Naples; Act 1 by Gian Francesco de Majo, Act 2 by Giacomo Insanguine)

References

External links

1730 births
1785 deaths
Italian male classical composers
Italian organists
Male organists
Italian opera composers
Male opera composers
Musicians from Naples
18th-century Italian composers
18th-century Italian male musicians
18th-century keyboardists